Will David Howe (August 25, 1873 – December 6, 1946) was an American educator, editor, and nonfiction writer. He was born in Charlestown, Indiana.  He taught at Butler University and Indiana University.

References

External links 

  (some for works as editor or publisher)

1873 births
1946 deaths
People from Charlestown, Indiana